Øistein Schirmer (11 April 1879 – 24 May 1947) was a Norwegian gymnast who competed in the 1912 Summer Olympics.

He was part of the Norwegian team, which won the gold medal in the gymnastics men's team, free system event. He was born in Fredrikstad and died in Larvik, but represented the club Kristiansands TF. He later emigrated to Texas where he died.

References

1879 births
1947 deaths
Norwegian male artistic gymnasts
Olympic gymnasts of Norway
Olympic gold medalists for Norway
Olympic medalists in gymnastics
Medalists at the 1912 Summer Olympics
Gymnasts at the 1912 Summer Olympics
Sportspeople from Fredrikstad
20th-century Norwegian people